Atwood Magazine is a digital music magazine that focuses on emerging and established artists from around the world. The magazine was founded in 2012 and is currently run by editor-in-chief Mitch Mosk.

History 
Atwood Magazine was founded in 2012 as a space to celebrate fresh creativity, support independent artists, and feature new music. Its stated mission is "to provide authentic writing, engaging, insightful editorials, and unique perspectives on music."

The website focuses on song and album reviews, exclusive premieres, featured interviews with up-and-coming and established artists, editorials, and concert reviews and photography. Columns include the daily "Today's Song" and the weekly "Editor's Picks". The staff also publishes a Weekly Roundup every Friday, where writers highlight what they've been listening to past week.

The website currently publishes approximately 20 articles per week, and employs 40 volunteer writers based in countries throughout North America, Europe, and Oceania.

In May 2019, Atwood was a Webby Award honoree for best music website.

In June 2019, Atwood published its first podcast, Tunes & Tumblers, which pairs new and classic albums with cocktail recipes.

References

External links
 

2012 establishments in Australia
2012 establishments in the United Kingdom
2012 establishments in the United States
Internet properties established in 2012
Music magazines published in the United States